Ubisoft Leamington (formerly FreeStyleGames Limited) is a British video game developer and a studio of Ubisoft based in Leamington Spa. Founded in November 2002 by six industry veterans formerly of Codemasters and Rare, the studios was bought by Activision in September 2008. In January 2017, Ubisoft acquired the studio from Activision and renamed it Ubisoft Leamington. Ubisoft Leamington is working on AAA games, primarily the Tom Clancy's The Division franchise, in close cooperation with sister studio Ubisoft Reflections.

History

Early years (2002–2008) 

FreeStyleGames was founded on 29 November 2002 by Alex Darby, David Osbourn, Phil Hindle and Jamie Jackson, formerly of Codemasters, and Alex Zoro and Jonny Ambrose, formerly of Rare.

Their first title, B-Boy, a game of competitive break-dancing, was published and distributed by Sony Computer Entertainment Europe in Europe in 2006, and published by Evolved Games and distributed by SouthPeak Games in North America in 2008. B-Boy features Crazy Legs of the Rock Steady Crew, as well as many other well known b-boys from around the World. It won the IGN best of E3 2006 award for best PSP music game.

As part of Activision (2008–2017) 
On 12 September 2008, FreeStyleGames was purchased by Activision for an undisclosed sum, following a period of commercial cooperation, mainly involving localised downloadable content for the Guitar Hero series.

The first game the company developed under Activision's ownership was DJ Hero (2009), a spin-off of the Guitar Hero series, in which players used a turntable-based controller to mimic the actions of a disc jockey across numerous songs. The title was considered successful, and they completed DJ Hero 2 the following year, though around that time, the rhythm game genre was suffering from a glut of releases and was in decline, and Activision had decided to end further production of any Guitar Hero title. The company had to lay off some employees during this time, but still were financially viable with success of Sing Party (2012). As Sing Partys development was wrapping up, Activision approached FreeStyleGames to have them consider how to reboot the Guitar Hero franchise. FreeStyleGames developed a new guitar controller atypical of ones that has been created to that point, and crafted a different approach towards presenting the game to players through a first-person perspective full-motion video. This work culminated in Guitar Hero Live (2015), the first new Guitar Hero title for the eighth generation of video game consoles.

While Guitar Hero Live was praised by critics, it failed to have significant sales, falling short of Activision's projections. On 1 April 2016, it was announced that around 50 staff were made redundant as part of a reshuffle by Activision. Founders Jackson and Osbourn opted to leave the studio at that point, disappointed in how development studios are treated when games are not financially successful, and along with two of the laid-off staff, Jonathan Napier and Gareth Morrison, formed a new studio, Slingshot Cartel. This studio anticipates developing games in a process more akin to filmmaking, something that the studio had to do during the course of development of Guitar Hero Live, which they seem can better streamline the process and reduce costs for game production.

As Ubisoft Leamington (2017–present) 
On 18 January 2017, French publisher Ubisoft acquired the studio from Activision, and renamed it Ubisoft Leamington, referencing its Leamington Spa location. Under this new owner, Ubisoft Leamington will work on AAA titles closely with Newcastle-upon-Tyne-based partner studio Ubisoft Reflections.

Games developed

References

External links 
 

2002 establishments in England
British companies established in 2002
Former Activision subsidiaries
Ubisoft divisions and subsidiaries
Video game companies established in 2002
Video game companies of the United Kingdom
Video game development companies
Companies based in Leamington Spa
2008 mergers and acquisitions
2017 mergers and acquisitions
British subsidiaries of foreign companies